Awakeri is a village located southwest of Whakatane in the Bay of Plenty region of New Zealand's North Island. It is located in a farming and fruit-growing area, has basic amenities and a primary school for students aged 5 to 13, and is best known for nearby hot springs.

Awakeri is located at the junction of State Highways 2 and 30 on the route of SH 2 from Edgecumbe to Taneatua and the route of SH 30 from Whakatane to Te Teko, and the two highways run together briefly through the village.

The New Zealand Ministry for Culture and Heritage gives a translation of "ditch" or "trench" for Awakeri.

The Taneatua Branch railway line also passes through the town, it was disused, however a tourist rail operator has recently leased a section of the branch line from KiwiRail and is opening a rail cart operation. Passenger train services ran through Awakeri and were provided by the Taneatua Express train from 1928 until 7 February 1959, when the steam-hauled carriage train was replaced by an 88-seater railcar service that terminated before Awakeri, in Te Puke. A private railway operated by the CHH Whakatane Mill used to run from Awakeri station to the mill at Whakatane. The line (now closed and lifted) used to run alongside State Highway 30, including along the front of the petrol station forecourt at Awakeri.

Demographics
Awakeri is in two SA1 statistical areas which cover . The SA1 areas are part of the Thornton-Awakeri statistical area.

The SA1 areas had a population of 291 at the 2018 New Zealand census, an increase of 12 people (4.3%) since the 2013 census, and an increase of 24 people (9.0%) since the 2006 census. There were 96 households, comprising 153 males and 135 females, giving a sex ratio of 1.13 males per female, with 72 people (24.7%) aged under 15 years, 42 (14.4%) aged 15 to 29, 132 (45.4%) aged 30 to 64, and 42 (14.4%) aged 65 or older.

Ethnicities were 87.6% European/Pākehā, 22.7% Māori, 2.1% Pacific peoples, 6.2% Asian, and 1.0% other ethnicities. People may identify with more than one ethnicity.

Although some people chose not to answer the census's question about religious affiliation, 60.8% had no religion, 28.9% were Christian, 1.0% had Māori religious beliefs and 3.1% had other religions.

Of those at least 15 years old, 18 (8.2%) people had a bachelor's or higher degree, and 45 (20.5%) people had no formal qualifications. 42 people (19.2%) earned over $70,000 compared to 17.2% nationally. The employment status of those at least 15 was that 111 (50.7%) people were employed full-time, 45 (20.5%) were part-time, and 6 (2.7%) were unemployed.

Thornton-Awakeri statistical area

Thornton-Awakeri had a population of 2,289 at the 2018 New Zealand census, an increase of 174 people (8.2%) since the 2013 census, and an increase of 273 people (13.5%) since the 2006 census. There were 756 households, comprising 1,167 males and 1,122 females, giving a sex ratio of 1.04 males per female. The median age was 41.3 years (compared with 37.4 years nationally), with 486 people (21.2%) aged under 15 years, 396 (17.3%) aged 15 to 29, 1,059 (46.3%) aged 30 to 64, and 348 (15.2%) aged 65 or older.

Ethnicities were 77.6% European/Pākehā, 34.2% Māori, 1.7% Pacific peoples, 1.6% Asian, and 0.9% other ethnicities. People may identify with more than one ethnicity.

The percentage of people born overseas was 8.7, compared with 27.1% nationally.

Although some people chose not to answer the census's question about religious affiliation, 56.6% had no religion, 29.9% were Christian, 4.8% had Māori religious beliefs, 0.1% were Buddhist and 1.2% had other religions.

Of those at least 15 years old, 237 (13.1%) people had a bachelor's or higher degree, and 348 (19.3%) people had no formal qualifications. The median income was $34,200, compared with $31,800 nationally. 327 people (18.1%) earned over $70,000 compared to 17.2% nationally. The employment status of those at least 15 was that 942 (52.2%) people were employed full-time, 312 (17.3%) were part-time, and 63 (3.5%) were unemployed.

Sports

The Awakeri Football Club is based at the school, with football the dominant sport.

Education

References

Whakatane District
Populated places in the Bay of Plenty Region